Lebanon competed at the 2000 Summer Olympics in Sydney, Australia.

Results by event

Athletics

Men

Women

Swimming

Men

Women

Weightlifting

Men

References
Official Olympic Reports

Nations at the 2000 Summer Olympics
2000 Summer Olympics
Summer Olympics